Feihyla palpebralis is a species of frog in the family Rhacophoridae, sometimes known as the Vietnamese bubble-nest frog or the white-cheeked small treefrog. In addition to its type locality, Langbian Plateau in southeastern Vietnam, it is found in southern China (southern Yunnan and western Guizhou) and northern Vietnam south to Tam Dao, and is expected to be found in the intervening Laos and Vietnam.

A late-stage tadpole measured .

Natural habitats of Feihyla palpebralis are pools and swampy riparian areas in forests; its habitat outside the breeding season is poorly known. They lay single eggs on plant stems above water. Reproductive season in the Central Highlands of Vietnam is April–May.

This species is threatened by habitat loss caused by forest degradation and water pollution.

References

palpebralis
Amphibians of China
Amphibians of Vietnam
Taxonomy articles created by Polbot
Amphibians described in 1924